is a former Japanese football player and manager.

Playing career
Oishi was born in Osaka Prefecture on October 24, 1976. After graduating from Komazawa University, he joined newly was promoted to J2 League club, Ventforet Kofu in 1999. On April 18, he debuted as substitute midfielder from the 75th minute against Montedio Yamagata. He played several matches as offensive midfielder until May. However he could not play at all in the match from June and retired end of 1999 season.

Coaching career
In 2014, Oishi signed with newly was promoted to J3 League club, Fujieda MYFC and became a coach under manager Musashi Mizushima. In 2015, he became a manager as Mizushima successor. Although the club finished at 10th place of 13 clubs in 2015 season, the club rose at middle place in 2016 season and 2017 season. However the club results were bad in 2018 and he resigned in July when at 14th place of 17 clubs. In 2019, he signed with newly was promoted to J3 club Vanraure Hachinohe.

Club statistics

Managerial statistics
Update; December 31, 2018

References

External links

1976 births
Living people
Komazawa University alumni
Association football people from Osaka Prefecture
Japanese footballers
J2 League players
Ventforet Kofu players
Japanese football managers
J3 League managers
Fujieda MYFC managers
Vanraure Hachinohe managers
Association football midfielders